Gabrijela "Gabi" Novak (born 8 July 1936) is a Croatian pop and jazz singer. A wife of the prominent Croatian singer-songwriter Arsen Dedić, whom she married in 1973, Novak became popular in the 1960s.

Biography 
Born in Berlin into a family of father Đuro Novak, a Croat from Hvar, and mother Elizabeth Reiman, a German from Berlin, Gabi Novak spent her childhood in her hometown but later she moved to Yugoslavia. Her father was killed in 1945. 

Novak was married to the prominent composer Stipica Kalogjera but in 1970, they got divorced. On 30 March 1973, she married Arsen Dedić, a renowned singer-songwriter who also composed many of her songs. The couple had one son Matija, today a renowned jazz pianist.

Awards
Gabi Novak is the winner of several Porin awards:
 Best Jazz Performance (2002)
 Album of the Year (2003)
 Best Female Vocal Performance (2003)
 Best Pop Album (2003)
 Best Vocal Collaboration (2003)
 Lifetime Achievement Award (2006).

References

External links

 Biography 
 Gabi Novak 

1936 births
Living people
20th-century Croatian women singers
Croatian pop singers
Yugoslav women singers
21st-century Croatian women singers